Frederick "Fred" Lynch (born 10 May 1936) is a former Australian rules footballer who played with Essendon in the Victorian Football League (VFL).

Lynch appeared in six of the opening eight rounds of the 1956 VFL season, while on permit from Coragulac. He wasn't able to fully commit to Essendon due to his farm work and chose to remain in the Hampden Football League. A half back flanker, he played briefly for Colac, before returning to Coragulac in 1959. He won the Maskell Medal in 1961.

His son, Paul Lynch, played for Geelong from 1993 to 2000.

References

1936 births
Australian rules footballers from Victoria (Australia)
Essendon Football Club players
Colac Football Club players
Coragulac Football Club players
Living people